Dolichoderus kathae is a species of ant in the genus Dolichoderus. Described by Shattuck and Marsden in 2013, the species is endemic to semi-arid regions in South Australia.

References

Dolichoderus
Hymenoptera of Australia
Insects described in 2013